Asma bint Adiy al-Bariqi also known as Bariqiyyah, (340 CE)  was the mother of Kilab's half-brothers Taym and Yaqazah. Ibn Ishaq named her Hind al-Bariqiyyah.

Her sons

Yaqaza was the father of Makhzum.
Taym, father of Banu Taym ancestor of Abu Bakr

Family tree

References

4th-century women
4th-century Arabs
Family of Muhammad
340 births
Banu Bariq
Year of death missing